Jerry Wayne Hussey (born 26 May 1958) is an English musician who was born in Bristol, England. He is best known as the lead singer of The Mission, and the guitarist with The Sisters of Mercy.

Biography 
Hussey grew up in Bristol. He was influenced at a young age by Marc Bolan and his band T. Rex, and was thus inspired to become a guitarist. Brought up in the LDS Church, he rebelled against his parents' wishes that he serve as a missionary and moved to Liverpool in the late 1970s to join the scene around Eric's Club, a noted nightclub of the time.

Hussey started to perform, most notably with Pauline Murray and The Invisible Girls, with whom he started songwriting. The first success for Hussey came when he joined Dead or Alive at the request of frontman Pete Burns. After Burns retreated to become more studio-based, Hussey decided to leave and was offered a position with The Sisters of Mercy, concentrating on 12-string and 6-string guitars, contributing to arrangements and using his higher ranged voice for backing vocals which contrasted with Andrew Eldritch's melancholic baritone. After leaving the Sisters of Mercy, Hussey and bassist Craig Adams set up The Mission, recruiting Mick Brown on drums and Simon Hinkler on guitars. He lived in Leeds for a while before moving to London towards the end of the 1980s.

Hussey has produced and played on records by The Mission's Mercury Records labelmates All About Eve and in the late 1990s provided some remixes for Cleopatra Records. He also produced, remixed and appeared on some tracks for the US band Gossamer including the track "Run" for the first Unquiet Grave compilation by Cleopatra Records. He also produced and played on Brilliant Mistakes by the Greek band Flowers of Romance. Hussey has played live with both Gary Numan and The Cure. He is a Liverpool F.C. supporter and after his team's victory in the Champions League Final of 2005, he composed the song entitled "Draped in Red" featured on the album God is a Bullet.

In 2019 Hussey released his autobiography Salad Daze. 

Hussey currently lives in São Paulo, Brazil, married to a Brazilian actress, Cinthya, and has two children from previous relationships.

Solo career
Since 2002, Hussey has regularly played solo shows that features Mission material, new songs and covers. After he wound up The Mission for the second time in early 2009, he released his first solo album called Bare in October of that year on the Sony Music label. (In Germany, there are four bonus tracks.)

In May 2009, Hussey announced on The Mission's website and in an interview on BBC 6 Music that he and Julianne Regan were working together on an album of cover songs, reinterpretations of old material and new songs, and invited fans to suggest songs for the duo to cover. This album was eventually released in the autumn of 2011 as Curios under the name Hussey-Regan on Cherry Red Records. In 2014, he released his second solo album, Songs of Candlelight & Razorblades, of largely acoustic songs.

In August 2020 Hussey re-recorded "Tower of Strength" as ReMission International TOS 2020, in support of key workers dealing with Covid-19 globally. All proceeds went to charities personally chosen by each contributor to TOS2020. On this project Wayne collaborated with friends and musicians, including Michael Ciravolo, Andy Rourke, Billy Duffy, Budgie, Evi Vine, Gary Numan, James Alexander Graham (from The Twilight Sad), Jay Aston, Julianne Regan, Kevin Haskins, Kirk Brandon, Lol Tolhurst, Martin Gore, Michael Aston, Midge Ure, Miles Hunt, Rachel Goswell, Richard Fortus, Robin Finck, Tim Palmer, and Trentemøller.

Equipment 

When playing live solo, Hussey uses a Martin D42. When playing live with the band, Hussey currently uses a Schecter Corsair 12-string. In the studio, he uses both a Fender Telecaster and Fender Starcaster.

Discography

Dead or Alive
It's Been Hours Now EP (1982)
The stranger/Some of that (1982)
Sophisticated Boom Boom (1984)

The Sisters of Mercy
Body and Soul (1984)
Walk Away (1984)
No Time To Cry (1985)
First and Last and Always (1985)

The Mission
God's Own Medicine (1986)
The First Chapter (1987)
Children (1988)
Carved in Sand (February 1990)
Grains of Sand (November 1990)
Masque (1992)
Neverland (1995)
Blue (1996)
Aura (2001)
God is a Bullet (2007)
Dum Dum Bullet (2011)
 The Brightest Light (2013)
 Another Fall from Grace (2016)

Solo
Bare (2009)
Songs of Candlelight and Razorblades (2014)

Guthrie Handley with Wayne Hussey 

 Where Was? (single) (1987)

Stisch featuring Wayne Hussey
 Hit Repeat (single) (2008)

Wayne Hussey and Julianne Regan
 Curios (2011)

Wayne Hussey and James Bacon
As Irmãs Siamesas (2018)

Wayne Hussey and The Divine
 Live At The Yellow Arch (2020)

ReMission International
 TOS2020 (single) (2020)

References

1958 births
Living people
Musicians from Bristol
Former Latter Day Saints
English male guitarists
English rock guitarists
English male singers
English songwriters
English new wave musicians
British alternative rock musicians
British indie rock musicians
Gothic rock musicians
Male new wave singers
Dead or Alive (band) members
The Sisters of Mercy members
The Mission (band) members
British post-punk musicians
20th-century English musicians
The Invisible Girls members